Luckhnowi Ishq is a 2015 Indian romance film directed by Aanand Raut. It stars Adhyayan Suman and Karishma Kotak in lead roles. The film is produced by KC Films. It tells the love story of a young medical student from Delhi and a girl from Lucknow.

The film promises glimpses of the rich culture and surroundings of Lucknow. The movie was released on 3 April 2015.

Plot
Prem (Adhyayan Suman) a medical student of Lucknow attends his friend's wedding and falls in love with Sunaina (Karishma Kotak). It is love at first sight and Prem wants to marry Sunaina; he even fights her brother Krishna who shares a close bond with his sister. Prem swears to marry Sunaina in the next 10 days and manages to keep his word.
Prem is depressed and is not able to concentrate on work when Professor K.K (Sharat Saxena) scolds him. He later consoles Prem and asks him to focus on his studies since he is a very bright student and the professor wants him to top the MBBS exams.
At Sunaina's home, everyone is very upset and Sunaina decides that she would find Prem and bring him to justice to stop the entire family's suffering. She swears that she would only come back once she finds Prem. Meanwhile, KK plays love guru which gives the movie a pleasant feel.

Cast
 Adhyayan Suman as Prem
 Karishma Kotak as Sunaina
 Sharat Saxena as Professor K.K
 Amit Joshi
 Gehana Vasisth
Mukesh Khanna

Production
The film was denied permission while shooting in Lucknow in July 2014. The film's shooting was wrapped up in January and it was scheduled for a March release, however the film was then scheduled to be released in April 2015.

Marketing
The first look launch and music album of the film was launched at Andheri in Mumbai on 27 February 2015 in presence of the cast and the producer.

Soundtrack 

The soundtrack of Luckhnowi Ishq was composed by Raaj Aashoo while lyrics were written by Neeraj Gupta, Shakeel Azmi, Sudhakar Sharma & Kumaar.

References

External links
 
 
 Film Luckhnowi Ishq First Look and Music Launch

2015 films
2010s Hindi-language films
Films shot in Lucknow